Marshall station could refer to:

 Marshall station (Texas), a railroad station in Marshall, Texas
 Marshall station (Missouri)
 Marshall railway station in Marshall, Victoria
 Marshall Station, California, an abandoned settlement in Fresno County, California